Gas and Air is a 1923 American silent comedy film featuring Stan Laurel.

Cast
 Stan Laurel as Phillup McCann
 Katherine Grant as Garage owner's daughter
 Eddie Baker as Customer
 Charles Stevenson as Garage owner
 Noah Young
 Roy Brooks

See also
 List of American films of 1923

External links

1923 films
1923 short films
American silent short films
American black-and-white films
1923 comedy films
Films directed by Scott Pembroke
Silent American comedy films
American comedy short films
1920s American films